The 1990 England rugby union tour of Argentina was a series of matches played in July and August 1990 in Argentina by the England national rugby union team. It was the second tour of Argentina by England and was apparently arranged without the tour manager Geoff Cooke's knowledge and at an inconvenient time of the year for the England players in July and August. For this reason, eight England players declined the invitation to make the trip, and the only seasoned internationals on the tour were Will Carling, Richard Hill, Wade Dooley, Brian Moore, Jeff Probyn and Peter Winterbottom.

Touring party
Manager: Geoff Cooke
Assistant Manager: J.J. Elliott
Coach: Roger Uttley
Captain: Will Carling (Harlequins) 17 Caps

Matches
Complete list of matches played in Argentina:

 Legend: ALU= Alumni, ARU=Australia RU, BAC=Belgrano Athletic Club, BCR= Buenos Aires CRC, BN= Banco Nacón, CASI=C.A. San Isidro, CP=Club Pucará, CUBA=Club Universitario B.A., CUY=Unión de Rugby de Cuyo, HC=Hindú Club, LP= La Plata RC, NEW=Club Newman, PUY=Club Pueyrredón, SIC=San Isidro Club, UAR=Argentine Rugby Union, URT=Unión de Rugby de Tucumán

 BANCO NACIÓN: P.Soto; G.Benedetto, R.Zanero, P.Pérez, C.Gentile; H.Porta (capt.), F.Gómez; F.Rubio, P.Di Nisio, P.Franchi; R.Etchegoyen, E.Gallo; A.Marrón, O.Cando, G.Inganni. 
ENGLAND: J.Liley; N.Heslop, W.Carling (capt.), J.Buckton, C.Oti; D.Pears, R.Hill; D.Egerton, A.Robinson, M. Skinner; M.Poole, R.Kimmins; M.Linnett, B.Moore, V.Ubogu . 

TUCUMÁN: F.Williams; M.Terán, P.Gauna, J.Gianotti, G.Terán; J.Martínez Riera, P.Merlo; J.Santamarina, P.Bunader, P.Garretón; O.Fascioli, A.Macome; J.Coria, R.Le Fort, L.Molina.
 ENGLAND: S. Hodgkinson (J.Liley); T.Underwood, J.Buckton, G.Thompson, C.Oti; D.Pears, C.Morris; D.Winterbottom, T.Rodber, D.Ryan; W.Dooley, N.Redman; J.Probyn, John Olver, J.Leonard. 

 BUENOS AIRES: G.Angaut (LP; G.Jorge (CP, E.Laborde (CP, H.García Simón (PUY), S.Ezcurra (CUBA); L.Arbizu (BAC), A.Zanoni (PUY); R.Villalonga (ALU), P.Di Nisio (BN), E.Ezcurra (NEW); E.Etchegoyen (BN), G.Llanes (LP; H.Ballatore (ALU), A.Cubelli (BAC) (capt.), L.Lonardi (SIC).
 ENGLAND: D.Pears; N.Heslop, W.Carling (capt.), G.Thompson, C.Oti; P.Hull, R.Hill; D.Winterbottom, D.Egerton, D.Ryan; W.Dooley, N.Redman; V.Ubogu, J.Olver, J.Leonard. 

 CUYO: F.Lola; E.Saurina, C.Cipitelli (capt.), Carbonell, M.Roby; G.Filizzola, A.Orrico; M.Bertranou, M.Baeck, A.Filizzola; Gómez, Pascual; J.Acevedo, A.Gutiérrez, F Méndez
 ENGLAND: J.Liley; T.Underwood, J.Buckton, G.Childs, P.Hull; S. Hodgkinson, R.Hill; A.Skinner, T.Rodber, A.Robinson; M.Poole, R.Kimmins; J.Probyn, B.Moore (capt.), M.Linnet. 

ARGENTINA: A.Scolni (ALU); H.Vidou (BCR), M.Loffreda (SIC), (capt.), D.Cuesta Silva(SIC), (S.Salvat (ALU); R.Madero (SIC), F.Gómez (BN); P.Bertranou (CUY), M.Baeck (CUY), P.Garretón(URT); A.Iachetti (HC), E.Branca (CASI); L.Molina (URT), J.J.Angelillo (SIC), A.Rocca (BCR).
 ENGLAND: S. Hodgkinson; N. Heslop; W. Carling (capt.), J. Buckton, C. Oti; D. Pears, R. Hill; D. Ryan, P. Winterbottom, M. Skinner; W. Dooley, N. Redman; J. Probyn, B. Moore, J. Leonard. 

 CÓRDOBA: J.Cosa; M.Ambroggio, P.Garzón (capt.), M.Gil, N.Andreossi; H.Herrera, H.De Marco; L.Bedoya, S.Irazoqui, D.Tobal; J.Simes, C.Montenegro; G.Rivero, C.Hernández, A.Mammana.
 ENGLAND: J.Liley; C.Oti, G.Childs, G.Thompson, T.Underwood; P.Hull, S.Bates; A.Robinson, D.Egerton, J.Rodber; M.Poole, R.Kimmins; V.Ubogu, J.Olver, M.Linnet. 

 ARGENTINA:  A.Scolni (ALU); (S.Salvat (ALU), M.Loffreda (SIC), (capt.), D.Cuesta Silva(SIC), H.Vidou (BCR); R.Madero (SIC), F.Gómez (BN), M.Baeck (CUY), M.Bertranou (CUY), P.Garretón(URT); A.Iachetti (HC), E.Branca (CASI); D.Cash (SIC), J.J.Angelillo (SIC), M.Aguirre (ALU).  ENGLAND:  S. Hodgkinson; N.Helsop, W.Carling (capt.), J.Buckton, C.Oti; D.Pears, R.Hill; D.Ryan, P.Winterbottom, M. Skinner; W.Dooley (49' D.Egerton), N.Redman; J.Probyn, B.Moore, J.Leonard.

See also
 History of rugby union matches between Argentina and England

References

1990 rugby union tours
1990
Argentina
1990 in Argentine rugby union